Three Days of Love is a 1931 German drama film directed by Heinz Hilpert and starring Hans Albers, Käthe Dorsch, and Trude Berliner. It was made and distributed by the independent Felsom Film company. It was shot at the Tempelhof Studios in Berlin. The film's sets were designed by the art director Hans Jacoby.

Synopsis
A poor servant girl falls in love with a man but becomes convinced that he will leave her because of her poverty. Encouraged in this belief by his jealous former lover, she steals a ring and smart clothes to try and impress him. However this leads only to tragedy.

Cast

References

Bibliography

External links 
 

1931 films
1931 drama films
German drama films
Films of the Weimar Republic
1930s German-language films
Films directed by Heinz Hilpert
Films scored by Friedrich Hollaender
Films set in Berlin
German black-and-white films
1930s German films
Films shot at Tempelhof Studios